Liam Corrigan (born September 11, 1997) is an American rower. He competed in the men's eight event at the 2020 Summer Olympics for the United States, finishing the competition in 4th place. Corrigan was part of the winning Oxford team at the 2022 boat race.

References

External links
 
 Harvard Crimson bio

1997 births
Living people
American male rowers
Olympic rowers of the United States
Rowers at the 2020 Summer Olympics
People from Old Lyme, Connecticut
Harvard Crimson rowers